Thomas Thynne, 1st Viscount Weymouth (1640 – 28 July 1714) was a British peer in the peerage of England.

Biography
He was born the son of Sir Henry Frederick Thynne of Caus Castle, Shropshire, and Kempsford, Gloucestershire, and his wife, Mary, daughter of Thomas Coventry, 1st Baron Coventry of Aylesborough. His sister was Katherine Lowther who was an electoral patron. He succeeded his father as 2nd baronet (1681) and married Frances, daughter of Heneage Finch, 3rd Earl of Winchilsea. He was descended from the first Sir John Thynne of Longleat House. He was educated at Kingston Grammar School and entered Christ Church, Oxford on 21 April 1657. He was invested as a Fellow of the Royal Society on 23 November 1664.

He held the office of Envoy to Sweden between November 1666 and April 1669.

He was returned as Member of Parliament (M.P.) for Oxford University between 1674 and 1679 and for Tamworth between 1679 and 1681. He succeeded to the title of 2nd Baronet Thynne, of Kempsford on 6 March 1679. He was High Steward of Tamworth from 1679 and also High Steward of the Royal Town of Sutton Coldfield from 1679 until his death.

He was created 1st Viscount Weymouth, on 11 December 1682, with a special remainder; if he lacked male heirs among his own descendants, the title would be inherited by his two brothers, James and Henry Frederick. He was created 1st Baron Thynne of Warminster on 11 December 1682. On 13 December 1688, Weymouth carried an invitation to William III, Prince of Orange at Henley-on-Thames, along with Thomas Herbert, 8th Earl of Pembroke, after the flight of King James II in the Glorious Revolution.

He held the office of First Lord of Trade and Foreign Plantations between 30 May 1702 and April 1707. In this role, Weymouth is reputed to have introduced the Lord Weymouth Pine (Pinus strobus), in 1705. He planted it extensively on the estate at Longleat. The Lord Weymouth Pine was useful for ship masts, in that it grew tall and slender. Weymouth's reputation in connection to the pine is doubtful, since the name really derived from the explorer George Weymouth, totally unrelated, who first discovered this pine growing in colonial Maine. All Thomas Thynne did was to arrange for its importation, and prefix a "Lord" in front of the Weymouth in the tree's official appellation.

He was invested as a Privy Counsellor (P.C.) on 18 June 1702. In May 1707, at the time of the formation of the new Kingdom of Great Britain, Weymouth was relieved of the role of Privy Counsellor, .

In 1707, Thomas Thynne founded a grammar school for boys in the nearby market town of Warminster, with 23 free places for local boys. The first Master was Rev R. Barry. Over time this became known as the Lord Weymouth School.  In 1973 this school merged with St Monica's Girls' School to become Warminster School which continues to this day. The 1st Viscount is remembered at Warminster School by the naming of a boarding house, later converted to classrooms, after him. A strong link remains between the school and his successors.

He held the office of Warden of the Forest of Dean in 1712. He was re-invested as a Privy Counsellor (P.C.) on 8 March 1711.

William Legge, 1st Earl of Dartmouth wrote that "Lord Weymouth was a weak , proud man, with a vast estate... He was very liberal to non-jurors, though he always took the oaths himself; which occasioned his house being constantly full of people of that sort, who cried him up for a very religious man; which pleased him extremely, having affected to be thought so all his life; which the companions of his youth would by no means allow."

Thomas had his bouts of ill health. In fact in 1667, when he was laid low with the gout, he was never expected to recover - though he did. And in any case he managed to outlive all his male relatives, both his own and the succeeding generation, leaving him sadly without any grandsons from male issue. Family legend has it that he was twice offered an earldom during his final years. Yet without there being any male heir from his own loins, and with the inheritance of Longleat required by family entail to pass through the male line of descent from Sir John Thynne, he didn't really feel there was much point in accumulating any additional honours. He was more inclined to suppose that the whole line would soon be extinct, or too distant in blood ties for him to trouble himself. He had four sons, including Henry Thynne (1675–1708), all of whom predeceased him. He has an extensive article in the Dictionary of National Biography.

Longleat House and the Thynnes 

Longleat was purchased by Sir John Thynn in 1541. He was the first of the Thynne 'dynasty' - the family name was Thynn or Thynne in the 16th century, later Thynne only, but Alexander Thynn, 7th Marquess of Bath, who died in 2020, reverted to the spelling Thynn in the 1980s so that it would be clear how to pronounce it.

Sir John Thynne (1515–1580) purchased Longleat which was previously an Augustinian priory. He was a builder with experience gained from working on Syon House, Bedwyn Broil and Somerset House. In April 1567 the original house caught fire and burnt down. A replacement house was effectively completed by 1580. Adrian Gaunt, Alan Maynard, Robert Smythson, the Earl of Hertford and Humpfrey Lovell all contributed to the new building but most of the design was Sir John's work.

Thomas Thynne, 1st Viscount Weymouth (1640–1714) started the house's large book collection. Formal gardens, canals, fountains and parterres were created by George London with sculptures by Arnold Quellin and Chevalier David. The Best Gallery, Long Gallery, Old Library and Chapel were all added due to Wren. What changed most of all, were the general surroundings to the house, for Thomas was impassioned by the idea of gardens, and inspired in particular by Versailles. He employed George London to lay out a vast complex of ornate terraced flower beds, with symmetrical paths and avenues, to furnish Longleat with a decorative environment, which stretched for the most part eastwards, across the leat (having diverted 'the long lete' with a canal), and on up into what is now the safari park. The whole family, when gathered, took much delight in the home-grown fruit to be harvested at Longleat.

The house is still used as the private residence of the Thynn family. The Viscountcy of Weymouth has been held by the Marquesses of Bath since 18 Jun 1789. Alexander Thynn, 7th Marquess of Bath (1932-2020) was an artist and mural painter with a penchant for mazes and labyrinths (he created the hedge maze, the love labyrinth, the sun maze, the lunar labyrinth and King Arthur's maze on the property).

Bishop Ken, lodger
Thomas Ken, Bishop of Bath and Wells, when deprived of his see by William and Mary in 1691 after he refused to transfer his oath of allegiance from James, on the grounds that once given, it could not be forsworn, was given lodgings at Longleat and an £80 annuity by the 1st Viscount Weymouth, a friend since Oxford days.

Taking up residence on the top floor at Longleat for a period of some twenty years, he exerted a profound influence upon Thomas, becoming what some might describe as his conscience. Thomas thus acquired a reputation for good deeds, which he himself regarded as spontaneous enough, but which the friends of his youth were inclined to regard as having been inspired by his devout friend, the Bishop. And as an example of such benevolence, somewhere between the two of them, they founded the Lord Weymouth School, now Warminster School. Notable too is the fact that a portion of the West Wing was transformed into a chapel for the household's daily worship. Not that its interior ever matched the architectural finery of equivalent chapels in other stately homes, but it was in any case evidence of the devout spirit which prevailed at Longleat over that particular historical period.

While living in the house, Bishop Ken wrote many of his famous hymns, including 'Awake my soul', and, when he died in 1711, bequeathed his extensive library to the 1st Viscount.

Irish estates
Thomas Tynne gained land in Northern Ireland following the division of land in 1692 which came out of an agreement between the heirs of the two daughters of Robert Devereux, 2nd Earl of Essex. Earl Ferrers, the grandson of Lady Dorothy inherited her share, and Thomas Thynne, 1st Viscount Weymouth succeeded to the inheritance of Lady Frances Devereux, the Earl's elder daughter, later Marchioness of Hertford and Duchess of Somerset. This division was uneven, and in Lord Weymouth's favour. Lord Weymouth, however, behaved generously in order to rectify this injustice to Ferrers.

In his "Longleat: the Story of an English Country House" (London, 1978), David Burnett records (somewhat improbably, but on the evidence of the Bath estate archive):  '... In 1694 a Polish baron had written to Thomas Thynne, 1st Viscount Weymouth asking if he could lease  and the Irish estate town of Carrickmacross in order to settle 200 Protestant families from Silesia. Thomas consented, but the agreement was cancelled when the baron announced his intention to demolish the town and rebuild it in the Polish style."

Thomas Tynne sent his Irish agent instructions for building the Viscount Weymouth Grammar School, Carrickmacross. "I intend the school house shall be slated and made a convenient house, which will draw scholars and benefit the town; therefore the timber must be oak." But Thomas was an absentee landlord, and ten years elapsed before he discovered that his agent has embezzled the building fund and repaired an existing building. The school was eventually built, and its syllabus included "Oratory, Virtue, Surveying [and] Antiquities". The stern language of its ninth statute stated: "The master shall make diligent enquiry after such as shall break, cut or deface or anywise abuse the desks, forms, walls or windows of this school, and shall always inflict open punishment on all such offenders". Unlike Warminster School this school closed in 1955.

The 1st Viscount Weymouth died in 1714, without surviving male issue, and bequeathed his estates to his grand-nephew, also named Thomas Thynne, and ancestor of the Marquesses of Bath. Robert Shirley, 1st Earl Ferrers died in 1717, his estate, by agreement, devolving in equal parts to his four sons: Robert, George, Sewallis and John Shirley. Of these, only George survived and, as the others had died without issue, the whole estate passed to him. He was the grandfather of the Shirley brothers, Horatio Henry and Evelyn Philip, the 19th-century owners of the western moiety of Farney. The Shirleys were absentees, spending most of their time at Ettington in Warwickshire. In c.1750, they built a house near Carrickmacross for their occasional visits. It was not until 1826 that Robert's grandson, Evelyn John Shirley, laid the foundations of a mansion worthy of the family and estate near the banks of Lough Fea.

Family
Thynne married before 1672 Frances Finch, daughter of Heneage Finch, 3rd Earl of Winchilsea, and they had:
 Henry
 Thomas
 Frances, married Sir Robert Worsley, 4th Baronet
However, none of the children outlived their parents.

References

External links
Thynne Pedigree (members only link)
Warminster School

|-

1640 births
1714 deaths
17th-century English nobility
18th-century English nobility
17th-century English diplomats
1
Thomas
Fellows of the Royal Society
People educated at Kingston Grammar School
English MPs 1661–1679
English MPs 1679
English MPs 1680–1681
Members of the Privy Council of England
Members of the pre-1707 Parliament of England for the University of Oxford
Presidents of the Board of Trade
Alumni of Christ Church, Oxford
People of the Glorious Revolution
People with endocrine, nutritional and metabolic diseases
Royalty and nobility with disabilities